In heraldry, argent is the tincture of silver, and belongs to the class of light tinctures called "metals". It is very frequently depicted as white and usually considered interchangeable with it. In engravings and line drawings, regions to be tinctured argent are either left blank, or indicated with the abbreviation ar. 

The name derives from Latin argentum, translated as "silver" or "white metal". The word argent had the same meaning in Old French blazon, whence it passed into the English language.

In some historical depictions of coats of arms, a kind of silver leaf was applied to those parts of the device that were argent. Over time, the silver content of these depictions has tarnished and darkened. As a result, it can sometimes be difficult to distinguish regions that were intended as "argent" from those that were "sable". This leaves a false impression that the rule of tincture has been violated in cases where, when applied next to a dark colour, argent now appears to be sable due to tarnish.

Argent versus white
Arthur Charles Fox-Davies argued extensively in his book The Art of Heraldry: An Encyclopaedia of Armory that, though extremely rare, the colour white existed as an independent tincture in heraldry separate from argent. He bases this in part on the "white labels" used to differentiate the arms of members of the British Royal Family. However, it has been argued that these could be regarded as "white labels proper", thus rendering white not a heraldic tincture.

White does seem to be regarded as a different tincture from argent in Portuguese heraldry, as evidenced by the arms of municipal de Santiago do Cacém in Portugal, in which the white of the fallen Moor's clothing and the knight's horse is distinguished from the argent of the distant castle, and in the arms of the Logistical and Administrative Command of the Portuguese Air Force.

Meaning
Sometimes, the different tinctures are said to be connected with special meanings or virtues, and represent certain elements and precious stones. Even if this is an idea mostly disregarded by serious heraldists throughout the centuries, it may be of anecdotal interest to see what they are, since the information is so often sought after. Many sources give different meanings, but argent is often said to represent the following:
 Of jewels, the pearl
 Of heavenly bodies, the Moon
 Of metals, silver

Gallery

References

Metals (heraldry)
Silver
Shades of white